State Road 595 (NM 595) is a  state highway in the US state of New Mexico. NM 595's southern terminus is at NM 96 north of Regina, and the northern terminus is at the end of state maintenance north of Lindrith.

Major intersections

See also

References

595
Transportation in Rio Arriba County, New Mexico